The Ichvuveyem (also: Ичувеем Ichuveyem) is a stream in Far East Siberia flowing in a roughly westward direction. Its valley marks the southern limit of the Shelag Range. It passes through the sparsely populated areas of the Siberian tundra and flows into the East Siberian Sea at the Chaunskaya Bay. Its mouth is in a low, marshy area to the NE of the mouth of the Chaun.

The Ichvuveyem and its basin belong to the Chukotka Autonomous Okrug administrative region of Russia.

References

External links
  http://worldmaps.web.infoseek.co.jp/russia_guide.htm 
 Location
 Tourism and environment 

Rivers of Chukotka Autonomous Okrug
Drainage basins of the East Siberian Sea